Juan José Betancourt Quiroga (born 10 August 1978) is a Colombian Para-cyclist. He represented Colombia in the 2020 Summer Paralympics.

Career
Betancourt Quiroga represented Colombia in the 2020 Summer Paralympics. He won the bronze medal in the Road race T1–2 event.

References

1999 births
Living people
Colombian male cyclists
Cyclists at the 2020 Summer Paralympics
Medalists at the 2020 Summer Paralympics
Paralympic medalists in cycling
Paralympic bronze medalists for Colombia